The 2009 Northern Illinois Huskies football team represented Northern Illinois University as a member of the West Division of the Mid-American Conference (MAC) during the 2009 NCAA Division I FBS football season. Led by second-year head coach Jerry Kill, the Huskies compiled an overall record of 7–6 with a mark of 5–3 in conference play, placing second in the MAC's West Division. Northern Illinois was invited to the International Bowl, where they lost to South Florida . The team played home games at Huskie Stadium in DeKalb, Illinois.

Schedule

References

Northern Illinois
Northern Illinois Huskies football seasons
Northern Illinois Huskies football